Guacimal is a district of the Puntarenas canton, in the Puntarenas province of Costa Rica.

History 
Guacimal was created on 14 December 1939 by Decreto Ejecutivo 45.

Geography 
Guacimal has an area of  km2 and an elevation of  metres.

Demographics 

For the 2011 census, Guacimal had a population of  inhabitants.

Transportation

Road transportation 
The district is covered by the following road routes:
 National Route 605
 National Route 606

References 

Districts of Puntarenas Province
Populated places in Puntarenas Province